The Starboy: Legend of the Fall Tour was the fifth concert tour by Canadian singer the Weeknd, in support of his third studio album Starboy (2016). The tour started on February 17, 2017, at the Ericsson Globe in Stockholm and concluded on December 14, 2017 at Perth Arena in Perth.

Set lists

Europe 
This set list is representative of the show on March 13, 2017 in Birmingham. It is not representative of all concerts for the duration of the tour.

 "All I Know"
 "Party Monster"
 "Reminder"
 "Six Feet Under"
 "Low Life" / "Might Not"
 "Often"
 "Acquainted"
 "Ordinary Life" / "Stargirl Interlude"
 "Starboy"
 "Nothing Without You"
 "Rockin'"
 "Secrets" / "Can't Feel My Face"
 "In the Night"
 "Earned It"
 "Wicked Games"
 "High for This"
 "The Morning"
 "Sidewalks"
 "Crew Love"
 "Die for You"
 "I Feel It Coming"
Encore
  "False Alarm"
 "House of Balloons / Glass Table Girls"
 "The Hills"

North America (Phase 1) 
This set list is representative of the show on April 26, 2017 in Seattle.

 "Starboy"
 "Party Monster"
 "Reminder"
 "Six Feet Under"
 "Low Life"
 "Might Not" (with Belly)
 "Sidewalks"
 "Crew Love"
 "PRBLMS" (with 6LACK)
 "Often"
 "Acquainted"
 "Or Nah"
 "Some Way"
 "Tell Your Friends" / "Die for You"
 "True Colors"
 "Wicked Games"
 "Angel"
 "Earned It"
 "Rockin'"
 "Black Beatles" (with Rae Sremmurd)
 "Secrets"
 "Can't Feel My Face"
 "I Feel It Coming"
 "The Hills"

Tour dates

Cancelled shows

Notes

References 

2017 concert tours
The Weeknd concert tours
Concert tours of Europe
Concert tours of South America
Concert tours of North America
Concert tours of Oceania